Florida State Road 10A may refer to:
Florida State Road 10A (Lake City), the only signed SR 10A
Florida State Road 10A (Jacksonville), the unsigned designation for the Arlington Expressway
Florida State Road 10A (Pensacola), the unsigned designation for US 90 north of Pensacola
Florida State Road 10A (former), several former alignments that are now county roads